Operation Guardian Tiger IV was an operation conducted by Marines from the 3rd Battalion, 3rd Marine Regiment and Iraqi Police in the Haditha Triad area in 2006.  The operation was focused on conducting a census in the Baghdadi area with the goal of capturing terrorists and building up local police forces. Only a handful of Marines accompanied the Iraqis.

References

Military operations of the Iraq War involving the United States
Military operations of the Iraq War in 2006
United States Marine Corps in the Iraq War